Tanchon Commercial Bank (formerly called Changgwang Credit Bank; possibly called Danchon Bank) is a North Korean bank. It was originally opened in August 1986.

History

Tanchon Bank has about thirty employees and has regional offices specializing in weapon sales in the Middle East, Myanmar, and Africa.

According to a Business Insider article, it is the financial institution used "to repatriate and hold foreign currency accounts" and under the control of the Ministry of Industry.

The bank's purpose was to handle transactions concerning Yongaksan Trading Company and as a fund manager for the Second Economic Committee. At one time, the bank's leader was Maeng Bong-shik.

The bank's address is Saemul 1-Dong Pyongchon District, Pyongyang, North Korea.

Mun Chong-chol is a Tanchon Commercial Bank representative.

See also
List of banks in North Korea

References

Banks of North Korea